Typhleotris is a genus of cavefish that are endemic to caves in southwestern Madagascar. Although traditionally considered to belong to the family Eleotridae, studies show that they represent a distinct and far-separated lineage together with the Milyeringa cavefish from Australia, leading some to move them to their own family, Milyeringidae.

Species
The recognized species in this genus are:
 Typhleotris madagascariensis Petit, 1933
 Typhleotris mararybe Sparks and Chakrabarty, 2012
 Typhleotris pauliani Arnoult, 1959

See also
 Glossogobius ankaranensis, another cave fish species from Madagascar

References

 
Milyeringidae
Taxonomy articles created by Polbot